Sir George Philip Doolette (24 January 1840 – 19 January 1924), frequently referred to as George P. Doolette, was a mining entrepreneur and chairman of the Western Australian Mine Owners' Association.

Doolette was born in Ireland, and at the age of 15 emigrated with his parents George Dorham Doolette (c. 1814 – 20 June 1863) and Elizabeth "Eliza" Doolette, née Reynard (c. 1820 – 18 November 1883), to South Australia on the immigrant ship Nashwauk, which came ashore near Seaford, South Australia on 13 May 1855 and wrecked without loss of life.

With experience in the softgoods trade from his youth in Ireland, Doolette joined the drapery firm of A. Macgeorge & Co., King William Street, Adelaide, and in 1875 became the business's sole proprietor, trading as "George P. Doolette, Court and Clerical Tailors" etc., which business continued operating until 1890. 
He speculated in mining ventures in Broken Hill and formed the Adelaide Prospecting Party in 1893 with Sir George Brookman and others. Doolette was also chairman or a director of many other mining companies, including Oroya Brown Hill Co. Ltd, the Great Boulder Proprietary Gold Mines Ltd and the Sons of Gwalia Ltd.

Doolette was knighted in 1916. He died on 19 January 1924 at Caterham, England and his ashes were taken to Adelaide where they were interred in the North Road Cemetery.

Family 
Doolette married Mary Bartlett McEwin, daughter of orchardist George McEwin, on 9 November 1865. Mary Doolette died in 1890. Their children were:
George McEwin Doolette (1869–1888)
Dorham Longford Doolette (1872– )
Mary Elizabeth Doolette (1876– )
On 25 September 1895 Doolette married Fanny Lillie Robinson, née Dale (died 18 August 1916).

Public life 
 Justice of the peace (from 1887)
 Vice-president of YMCA (1884–85) 
 Treasurer of the London Missionary Society
 President of the Congregational Union (1885–86)
 Fellow of the Royal Colonial Institute (1894)
 Fellow of the Royal Geographical Society (1907)

References 

1840 births
1924 deaths
Australian mining entrepreneurs
Irish emigrants to colonial Australia
Knights Bachelor
Burials at North Road Cemetery
Australian justices of the peace
Fellows of the Royal Geographical Society
Australian Congregationalists
Fellows of the Royal Commonwealth Society